Efrosinia Yanenko-Khmelnytsky (died 1684), was a Ukrainian Hetmana by marriage to Petro Doroshenko, Hetman of Zaporizhian Host (r. 1665–1676).  She was an influential figure among the Ukrainian Cossacks.  She is known for her alleged life style, as she was said to have several extramarital affairs, and also for a myth regarding her importance for the independence of Ukraine.

References

 Степанков В. Петро Дорошенко // Володарі гетьманської булави: Історичні портрети / Автор передмови В. А. Смолій. — К. : Варта, 1994.— 560 с. — С. 288. 
 Любові Петра Дорошенка

1684 deaths
17th-century Ukrainian people
People from the Cossack Hetmanate